Tony Parton (born 12 January 1967) is a former English cricketer.  Parton was a left-handed batsman.  He was born in Wellington, Shropshire.

Parton made his debut for Shropshire in the 1988 MCCA Knockout Trophy against Cheshire.  Parton played Minor counties cricket for Shropshire from 1988 to 2004, which included 76 Minor Counties Championship appearances and 21 MCCA Knockout Trophy appearances.  He made his List A debut against Hampshire in the 1988 NatWest Trophy.  He made 8 further List A appearances, the last of which came against Warwickshire in the 2004 Cheltenham & Gloucester Trophy.  In his 9 List A matches, he scored 141 runs at an average of 17.62, with a high score of 51 not out.  This score, which was his only List A half century, came against Ireland in the 2000 NatWest Trophy. He has also appeared in Second XIs for Nottinghamshire, Glamorgan, Warwickshire, and Worcestershire.

At club level he has played in Shropshire for Shifnal, Wem, Wellington and Perkins of Shrewsbury, and outside Shropshire for Hampstead (London) and Dumfries (Scotland).

References

External links
Tony Parton at ESPNcricinfo
Tony Parton at CricketArchive

1967 births
Living people
People from Wellington, Shropshire
English cricketers
Shropshire cricketers